Donald Ranvaud (5 December 1953 - 5 September 2016) was a British film producer and film journalist.

Ranvaud had producing roles on a number of Oscar-nominated films including The Constant Gardener (2005), City of God (2002), Central Station (1998) and Farewell My Concubine (1993). He is now best known for his work in the Latin American film industry, especially in Brazil and Bolivia.

Early career 

From 1976–88, Ranvaud taught at the University of Warwick (English and comparative literature) and the University of East Anglia (film studies) and also at the College of South Wales (film theory). During this time he also worked as a freelance journalist for MFB, Sight and Sound, The Guardian, La Repubblica and American Film, as well as founding the independent cinema and media magazine Framework, which he edited until 1988. He published several books on Italian cinema and directed documentary items for C4 magazine programmes and RAI 1, including portraits of Paul Schrader, Raul Ruiz, Cui Jian, Laurie Anderson and David Mamet.

In April 1989 Ranvaud was hired as Head of Selection at the European Script Fund, which was established in January 1989 by Renee Goddard (Secretary General) as part of the MEDIA Programme of the Commission of the European Community. He stayed on for 18 months, selecting numerous feature film projects from across Europe for develop funding; during this time the Media Programme was fully integrated into EC policy.

Death 
Ranvaud was on the jury of the 2016 Montreal World Film Festival. He was taken to the hospital after calling for assistance in his hotel room in Montreal on the night of the last day of the festival. He was treated for a heart disorder.

Film production 

Ranvaud worked as a producer full-time after 1989, working with directors and in countries that would soon become prominent in the world of independent film: in China from 1989 to 1993, he produced Life on a String and Farewell My Concubine; in Latin America from 1994 to present, he produced Central do Brasil, Familia Rodante, Xango de Baker Street, Lavoura Arcaica, Babilonia 2000, Madame Sata, and City of God, garnering a total of 12 Oscar nominations. He was also executive producer on The Constant Gardener by Fernando Meirelles in Kenya.

Alongside productions, he managed sales at Videofilmes, Bouquet Multimedia and Sogepaq as well as helping to set up the Wild Bunch.

As Buena Onda's Creative Director since 2003, Ranvaud continued to discover filmmakers, helping them to access world markets. He was an ambassador for Latin American cinema, setting up joint ventures with Cinergia in Costa Rica for Centro America, and with the Puerto Rico Film Fund. After establishing the film school La Fabrica with Roberto Lanza in Cochabamba, Bolivia, he set up an Institute for 2nd features, theatre and cinema (Artes Andes Americas), together with Cesar Brie's Teatro de los Andes in Yotala, Bolivia.

Since early 2005, first as Head of International Relations with Rain Networks, Brasil, and later independently, Ranvaud focused on what he considered to be the central question for the future of a possible cinema – a cost-effective distribution platform.
Ranvaud’s final film as a producer is a still-unfinished first feature titled “Sweet Democracy,” 2016, with Italian Nobel-prize winning thesp Dario Fo among the cast. It is directed by Italy’s Michele Diomà.

Filmography

References

External links
 

1953 births
2016 deaths
Italian emigrants to the United Kingdom
British film producers
Academics of the University of Warwick
Academics of the University of East Anglia
British male journalists
20th-century British businesspeople